Out of Practice is an American sitcom television series that was produced by Paramount Television and originally broadcast on sister company CBS from September 19, 2005, to March 29, 2006. With producers Joe Keenan and Christopher Lloyd (Frasier'''s producers) at the helm, the show was about a family of five doctors who had little in common and usually did not get along. CBS officially cancelled it on May 17, 2006, at its upfront presentation.

 Plot
Ben Barnes is the youngest son and central character. As a marriage counselor and the only non-physician, the rest of his family sees him as a lesser doctor. His wife left him in the pilot episode.

Ben's father, Stewart Barnes, is a gastroenterologist who is happy to be free from the influence of his ex-wife, Lydia Barnes (Stockard Channing in her third sitcom starring role following Stockard Channing in Just Friends and The Stockard Channing Show), a status-conscious cardiologist and mother of their three children.

Ben's brother, Oliver Barnes, is a self-centered plastic surgeon and committed womanizer. Their sister, Regina Barnes, is a lesbian E.R. doctor, who like Oliver, is infatuated with attractive women. Crystal, Stewart's girlfriend and receptionist, is a source of frustration and awkwardness for all except Stewart. Tilly was a late addition to the cast and is not seen much in the pilot.

Cast
 Christopher Gorham as Benjamin "Ben" Barnes
 Henry Winkler as Stewart Barnes
 Stockard Channing as Lydia Barnes
 Ty Burrell as Oliver Barnes
 Paula Marshall as Regina Barnes
 Jennifer Tilly as Crystal

Episodes

 Broadcast 
Rumors of cancellation circulated after midseason replacement The New Adventures of Old Christine opened in the show's time slot in March 2006. In an interview, however, Burrell asserted that "[w]e're going on hiatus from the air for two months, but we're coming back in March with all-new shows." Two more episodes were shown on Wednesday, March 22, and Wednesday, March 29, at 8 ET/PT. The series was pulled from the schedule along with Courting Alex due to low ratings.

Syndication
As of December 2009, the show is being broadcast on Universal HD.  The show's full 22 episodes are available to view as part of Amazon's streaming service.

International airings
Beginning in April 2008, the show was broadcast on Comedy Central Poland at a rate of three episodes per week. The series was also shown in Australia, at 6:30pm Saturdays from October 2006; however the series attracted low audience shares, and was consequently taken off after five weeks. It reappeared in mid-2007 in a late-night timeslot, where it completed its run.
In Autumn of 2006 it was aired on AVALA in Serbia daily, with a re-run in 2007. In 2013, AVALA lost its national frequency.

Reception
In early July 2006, it was announced that Channing was nominated for the Primetime Emmy Award for Outstanding Lead Actress in a Comedy Series for her work on Out of Practice.''

References

External links
 

2005 American television series debuts
2006 American television series endings
2000s American sitcoms
American LGBT-related sitcoms
CBS original programming
Television shows set in New York City
English-language television shows
Television series by CBS Studios